Shiselweni is a region of Eswatini, located in the south of the country. It has an area of 3,786.71 km² and a population of 204,111 (2017). Its administrative center is Nhlangano. It borders Lubombo in the northeast and Manzini Region in the northwest.

Administrative divisions
Shiselweni is subdivided to 14 tinkhundla (or constituencies). These are local administration centres, and also parliamentary constituencies. Each inkhundla is headed by an indvuna yenkhundla or governor with the help of bucopho. The tinkhundla are further divided into imiphakatsi (or chiefdoms). The present tinkhundla are:

 Gege
 Imiphakatsi: Emhlahlweni, Emjikelweni, Endzingeni, Ensukazi, Kadinga, Katsambekwako, Mgazini, Mgomfelweni, Mlindazwe, Sisingeni
 Hosea
 Imiphakatsi: Ka-Hhohho Emva, Ludzakeni/Kaliba, Lushini, Manyiseni, Nsingizini, Ondiyaneni
 Kubuta
 Imiphakatsi: Ezishineni, Kakholwane, Kaphunga, Ngobelweni, Nhlalabantfu
 Maseyisini
 Imiphakatsi: Dlovunga, Kamzizi, Mbilaneni, Vusweni
 Matsanjeni South
 Imiphakatsi: Bambitje/Nsalitje, Dinabanye, Ekuphumleni, Qomontaba
 Mtsambama
 Imiphakatsi: Bhanganoma, Ekwendzeni, Kambhoke, Magele
 Ngudzeni
 Imiphakatsi: Ekukhanyeni, Ekulambeni, Lusitini, Ndushulweni, Ntjanini, Nyatsini
 Nkwene
 Imiphakatsi: Ebuseleni, Hlobane, Kagwebu, Kuphumleni, Nhlalabantfu, Sigcineni
 Sandleni
 Imiphakatsi: Bufaneni, Enkalaneni, Ka-Nzameya, Kagasa, Kontjingila, Mbelebeleni, Mphini, Ngololweni, Nkhungwini, Tibondzeni
 Shiselweni I
 Imiphakatsi: Dumenkungwini, Mabona, Mchinsweni, Zikhotheni
 Shiselweni II
 Imiphakatsi: Embheka, Mahlalini, Makhwelela, Mbabala, Mkhitsini, Mphangisweni, Sikhotseni
 Sigwe
 Imiphakatsi: Empini, Kankhomonye, Lindizwa, Lulakeni
 Somntongo
 Imiphakatsi: Ezindwenweni, Maplotini, Mlindazwe, Phangweni, Qomintaba, Vimbizibuko
 Zombodze
 Imiphakatsi: Bulekeni, Mampondweni, Ngwenyameni, Zombodze

Religion

Christianity and Islam are main religions in the region.

References

 
Regions of Eswatini